downset. is the debut studio album by American rapcore band downset. The band's major label debut, it was released on July 12, 1994 by Mercury Records.According to Rey Oropeza, the album has sold 275,000 copies worldwide.

Track listing

Personnel 

Adapted from Tidal and liner notes.

downset.
 Rey Oropeza – vocals, songwriting
 James Morris – bass guitar, songwriting
 Chris Lee – drums, songwriting
 Brian "Ares" Schwarger – guitar, songwriting
 Rogelio "Roy" Lozano – guitar, songwriting

Production
 Roy Z. – production, mixing, engineering, songwriting (2–4, 6–10)
 Joe Floyd – mixing, engineering (on tracks 1, 3–5, 10)
 Sean Kenesie – mixing, engineering (on tracks 1, 3–5, 10)
 Shay Bay – mixing, engineering (on tracks 2, 6–9)

Artwork

Barry Greenhut – artwork, design

References 

Mercury Records albums
1994 debut albums
Rap metal albums